General elections were held in the Netherlands on 5 July 1922. They were the first elections held under universal suffrage, which became reality after the acceptance of a proposal by Henri Marchant in 1919 that gave women full voting rights. Almost all major parties had a woman elected. The number of female representatives increased from one to seven. Only the Anti-Revolutionary Party principally excluded women from the House of Representatives. Another amendment to the electoral law increased the electoral threshold from 0.5% to 0.75%, after six parties had won seats with less than 0.75% of the vote in the previous elections.

The General League of Roman Catholic Caucuses remained the largest party, increasing from 30 to 32 seats, whilst the Anti-Revolutionary Party increased from 13 to 16 seats, and the Christian Historical Union went from 7 to 11 seats. The left-wing Christian Democratic Party and the Christian Social Party both lost their sole seats, disappearing from the House, while the Reformed Political Party (SGP) won a seat. The SGP, an orthodox Protestant party established in 1918, was opposed to the co-operation of the Protestant ARP and CHU with the Catholics.

The Social Democratic Workers' Party lost two seats, whilst left-wing splinter parties also suffered losses, and went from four to two seats.

Several liberal groups had merged in 1921 to form the Liberal State Party, but lost further seats as they were reduced from fifteen to only ten. However, a new Liberal Party led by the 85-year-old Samuel van Houten, won a seat. Van Houten himself did not take the seat, which was instead occupied by his representative, Lizzy van Dorp.

The Free-thinking Democratic League maintained, against most expectations, their five seats, whilst of the remaining splinter parties, only the Peasants' League was able to survive, rising from one to two seats.

After a relatively short formation, the second Ruijs de Beerenbrouck cabinet was formed, with largely the same composition as the previous one.

Results

References

General elections in the Netherlands
Netherlands
General
Netherlands
Election and referendum articles with incomplete results
General